Detroit Collaborative Design Center is an outreach of University of Detroit Mercy School of Architecture in response to the decline of Detroit, Michigan, with changes in the auto industry. It uses participatory community design to enhance the appearance and functionality of residential, business, and recreational areas as well as community centers, schools, and streetscapes.

History
In 1993, Stephen Vogel envisioned Neighborhood Design Studio within the Detroit Mercy School of Architecture, of which he was dean, to enhance the abilities of local leaders to produce quality design through broad-based community participation. He enlisted Terrence Curry from the faculty to establish the studio. Students assisted in bringing together stakeholders and expertise for planning: housing, mixed-use, retail, streetscapes, emergency shelters. Over time, the studio evolved into the Detroit Collaborative Design Center.

In 2017, the Institute won the American Institute of Architects Whitney M. Young Jr. Award.

References 

Jesuit development centres
History of Detroit
University of Detroit Mercy
Organizations established in 1994
Non-profit organizations based in the United States
Community-building organizations
Development charities based in the United States
Social welfare charities based in the United States
1994 establishments in Michigan